Hamid Reza Shekarsari (born on 1966 in Tehran) is an Iranian poet, researcher, author and literary critic. He has published more than 20 volumes of poetry and literary research.

Life and careers
Hamid Reza Shokarsari was born on 17 June 1966 in Tehran, Iran. He spent the first few years of his life in the north of Iran because his parents were from Rasht and Anzali. Until he completed his primary education and then entered Shahid Beheshti University to study geology. After completing his education, he was hired by the Ministry of Roads and Transport of Iran and worked there. He has been writing poetry since he was 16 years old, and for the first time in 1983, a sonnet from him was published in a magazine. Then, since 1986, he entered the field of poetry seriously. He began to criticize poetry since 1992. As a result, he entered the publishing world with his first book of poetry collection in 1996, entitled "Baz JomeEyi Gozasht (title means Another Friday Passes)". In addition, he has also been responsible for the literary center of the Young Cultural Center of Tehran.

Awards
Hamid Reza Shekarsari has received numerous literary awards so far, some of which are listed below:
 His book "Hamaseye Kalamat (title means Epic of Words), Review of the 20 Years of Holy Defense Poetry" has been selected as Book of Year in Holy Defense Year Book Award in 2002 and has also received the title of the Book of the Year in Poetry section of Holy Defense Year Book Award in 2004.
 His book "Cheraghanie bi Dalil (title means Unreasobale lighitning)" was recognized as the Book of the Year at Holy Defense Year Book Award in 2006 and was honored in Poetry section of Iran's Book of the Year Awards in same year. Also, it was final candidate of Golden Pen Book Festival of Iran in 2005.
 His poem collection "Aseman Zire Abrha (title means The sky under the clouds)" was selected book of third Razavi Book Festival in Modern Poetry section in 2010.
 His book "Asre Payane Mojezat (title means The era of no miracles)" was the final nominee of Iran's Book of the Year Awards in 2009.
 His book "Chizi Ghotb Nama ha ra Divaneh Mikonad (title means Something drives the compasses crazy)" was the Book of the Year of Holy Defense Year Book Award in Poetry section in 2010.
 His book "Asheghane hayee Baraye Doshman (title means The Romances for Enemy)" has become the Book of the Year of Holy Defense Year Book Award in Poetry section in 2014.
 His book "Talangore Baran (title means Flick of the Rain)" has won the Golden Pen Award of Iran in 2016.
 His book "Zist dar Mane JamEe (title means Living in collective character)" (Compilation with Mohammad Reza Roozbeh) was introduced as one of the five books of the year in fourth Holly Defense Book Festival of Lorestan Province in 2011.
 The selected poet of the Fajr Poetry Festival in the poetry section in 2008.
 Article presentation and poetry reading at Istanbul International Poetry Festival in 2009 and Universal Poetry Festival in China in 2012.
 The selected Artistic Expert by Jame Jam TV in 2010.
 As a representative of Iran, participated in Sarajevo Poetry Festival at Bosnia and Herzegovina in 2017.
 The selected poet and winner of the First Qods Literature Award.
 In January 2016, he was honored with the title of "Song of Liberation" by Iranian Poets and Literary Association.
 Judging dozens of national and provincial poetry festivals and congresses in Iran.

Translated books
In 2018, an excerpt from Hamid Reza Shekarsari's poems was translated into Istanbul Turkish by Shirin Rad in a book entitled "From the Heart of Tehran to the Heart of Istanbul" for publication in Turkey.

Also, the book "Asre Payane Mojezat", is a bilingual Persian-English book with English title of "The Era of No Miracles" which translated by Jedan Sepehri and Hossein Ahmadi and published in 2008.

Bibliography
 Cheraghanie bi Dalil (title means Unreasobale lighitning), Collection of poems on the subject of Sacred Defense, 2005
 Az Tamame Roshanayiha (title means From all the lights), Poetry Collection, 2003
 Pirtar az Khod (title means Older than self), Poetry Collection, 2008
 Az Sokout be Harf (title means From silence to speech), Collection of Literary Criticism, 2003
 Shelikam Kon: Pish az Anke Baroutam Nam Bekeshad! (title means Fire me: Before my gunpowder get moistured!), Analytical articles on the subject of resistance poetry, group of authors, 2011
 Aseman Zire Abrha (title means The sky under the clouds), Collection of Poems about Imam Reza, 2007
 Asre Payane Mojezat (title means The era of no miracles), Poetry Collection, 2008
 Hamasehaye Maktabi (title means The Doctrine Epics), Articles on the subject of Ashura poetry, 2011
 Teroriste Asheq (title means The Terrosrist in Love), Selected Poems, 2008
 Hoftado do Ghatreh Ashke Ashurayi (title means Seventy-Two drops of Ashura tears), Collection of Ashura Poems, 2012
 Zist dar Mane JamEe (title means Living in collective character), Criticism of Holy Defense Poetry Works, along Dr. Mohammad Reza Rouzbeh, 2010
 Chizi Ghotb Nama ha ra Divaneh Mikonad (title means Something drives the compasses crazy), Free Poems Collection about Holy Defense, 2009
 Tanha Barf Kooch Nakarde Ast (title means Only the snow did not immigrate), Blank Verse Collection, 2012
 Har Shaer Derakhtist (title means Each poet is a tree), Selected Poetry by Members of the Young Cultural Literary Center of Tehran, 2011
 Zarihe Sadeh (title means Simple Shrine), Selected religious poems from 1990 to 2007, 2008
 Chatre Shoureshi (title means The Rebel umbrella), 100 Short Poetry with Cloud Theme, 2011
 Zayesh Marg haye Matn (title means Births and Deaths of the text), Review of Blank Verse Poems, 2011
 Zayesh Marg haye Matn 2 (title means Births and Deaths of the text 2), Criticism and Interpretation of Persian Poetry, 2016
 Zayesh Marg haye Matn 3 (title means Births and Deaths of the text 3), Criticism of contemporary short poems, 2019
 Parantez haye Shekasteh (title means Broken brackets), Poetry Collection, 2009
 Baz JomeEyi Gozaht (title means Another Friday Passes), Poetry Collection, 1996
 Gozideye Adabiate Moaser (title means A selection of contemporary literature), Free Poems Collection, 1999
 Hamaseye Kalamat (title means Epic of Words), Review of the 20 Years of Holy Defense Poetry, 2001
 Rade Pa bar Labeye Tiq (title means Spoor on the edge of the razor), Free Poems Collection, 2015
 Asheghane haye Tarik Roshan (title means The Bright and Gloomy Romances), Romantic Poetry Collection, 2013
 Che Tanhast Mah (title means What a lonely moon), A collection of Blank Verse poems, 2016
 Asheghane haye Posti (title means Postal romances), Poetry Collection, 2016
 Shab Nameh (title means Letter of the Night), A poem collection with theme of night, 2018
 Shekl haye Faramooshi (title means Shapes of oblivion), Collection of short and free poems, 2017
 Tazahorate Harf haye Ezafeh (title means Demonstrations of extra talks), Free Poems Collection, 2017
 Boseye Tarsoo (title means Timid kiss), Collection of social poems, 2017
 Dalile Panjereh (title means Reason of Window), A collection of poems about Laylat al-Qadr, 2017
 Haft Sin dar Bahman Mah (title means Haft-sin in Bahman), Poetry Collection, 2017
 Asheghane hayee Baraye Doshman (title means The Romances for Enemy), Poetry Collection, 2013
 Saye Roshan haye Sayeh (title means Bright Shades of Shadows), A Review of Hushang Ebtehaj's Poems, 2019
 Asheghane haye Pekan (title means The Beijing's Romances), Blank Verses Collection, 2013
 Estemrare Tazegi (title means The continuity of novelty), A critique and analysis of the works of several contemporary poets, 2019
 Be Ensan Migoftand Andooh (title means Human called grief), Poetry Collection, 2018
 Shekl haye Forootani (title means The Figures of Humility), Free Poems Collection, 2013
 Talangore Baran (title means Flick of the Rain), Juvenile Poetry Collection, 2015
 Shekl haye Leila (title means The Figures of Leila), Romantic poetry collection, 2018
 Shekl haye Marg (title means The Figures of Death), Free Short Poetry Collection, 2016
 Tarife Tazeye Andooh (title means A New Definition of Sadness), A collection of Poems about Ruhollah Khomeini, 2015
 Moamaye Pirahane Tow (title means The riddle of your shirt), Free romantic poetry collection, 2015
 Satri Por az Meyle Booseh (title means A line with full passion of kiss), Social and political and romantic poetry, 2017
 Tamrine Sokout Mikonam Baed az Tow (title means I practice silence after you), Collection of Quatrains, 2019
 Cheraq Qovveh dar Chashme Khorshid (title means Flashlight in the eye of sun), Free Poems Collection, 2018
 Shekl haye Goor (title means The Figures of the grave), Free Poems Collection, 2018
 Be Dashtane Tow Edameh Midaham (title means I'll keep having you), Blank Verses Collection, 2018
 Asheghane haye Renoye Pire Ghermez (title means The old red Renault romances), Blank Verses Collection, 2019

See also
 List of Persian poets and authors

References

External links
 Image Report of the Critical Review of the Book of the Year "Cheraghanie bi Dalil"
 Video of Poetry by Hamid Reza Shekarsari
 Video of Poetry by Hamid Reza Shekarsari in TV program
 Some Poems of Hamidreza Shekarsari in Persian
 Hamidreza Shekarsari News in Persian on Mehr News Agency
 Research and criticism of Hamidreza Shekarsari in Farsi
 Hamidreza Shekarsari News in Persian on Tasnim News Agency
 Geologist poet
 Hamidreza Shokarsari's books on goodreads
 Video by Hamid Reza Shekarsari about his book
 The continuity of novelty, A critique and analysis of the works of several contemporary poets, video by Shekarsari
 Hamidreza Shekarsari Articles in Persian

Living people
1966 births
Recipients of the Holy Defense Year Book Award
Iranian male poets
Iranian literary critics
People from Tehran
Persian-language writers
20th-century Iranian poets
Iranian critics
Researchers of Persian literature
Iran's Book of the Year Awards recipients
21st-century Iranian poets